John Grinham Kerr (November 15, 1931February 2, 2013) was an American actor and attorney. He began his professional career on Broadway, earning critical acclaim for his performances in Mary Coyle Chase's Bernardine and Robert Anderson's Tea and Sympathy, before transitioning into a screen career. He reprised his role in the film version of Tea and Sympathy, which won him the Golden Globe Award for Most Promising Newcomer, and portrayed Lieutenant Joseph Cable in the Rodgers and Hammerstein movie musical South Pacific. He subsequently appeared in number of television series, including a starring role on the primetime soap opera Peyton Place.

In the 1970s, he largely moved away from acting to become a lawyer, making a few small cameos in Canadian-produced films like Plague and The Amateur. He operated a legal practice in Beverly Hills until 2000, when he retired from the profession.

Early life 

Kerr was born November 15, 1931, in New York City to British-born Geoffrey Kerr and American-born June Walker.  Both were stage and film actors, and his grandfather was Frederick Kerr, a British trans-Atlantic character actor  in the period 1880–1930; Kerr developed an early interest in following in their footsteps.

He grew up in the New York City area, and went to Phillips Exeter Academy in New Hampshire; after graduating from Harvard, he worked at the nearby Brattle Theatre in Cambridge, Massachusetts and in summer stock. For some time he pursued graduate studies in the Russian (now Harriman) Institute of Columbia University.

Acting career

Stage
He made his Broadway debut in 1953 in Mary Coyle Chase's Bernardine, a high-school comedy for which he won a Theatre World Award. In 1953-54, he received critical acclaim as a troubled prep school student in Robert Anderson's play Tea and Sympathy. In 1954, he won a Tony Award, New York Drama Critics Award, and Donaldson Award for his performance, and he later starred in the film version in 1956. He subsequently starred in stagings of All Summer Long and The Infernal Machine, and both starred and directed a staging of Bus Stop at the Fred Miller Theatre in Milwaukee.

Throughout the 1960s, he was affiliated with a number of non-profit theatre companies in Southern California, including the La Jolla Playhouse, the UCLA Theatre Group. For a time he was an artist-in-residence at Stanford University. He was the producer of a 1964 summer season of the American National Theater and Academy, held at Beverly Hills High School.

Film and television
Kerr's first television acting role was in 1954 on NBC's Justice as a basketball player who believes that gamblers have ruined his success on the court. His mother appeared with him on the series, which focuses on the cases of attorneys with the Legal Aid Society of New York. 

He made The Cobweb for MGM, who liked his work so much they co-starred him with Leslie Caron in Gaby (1956), the third remake of Waterloo Bridge, which, in its original pre-Code 1931 version, featured John's grandfather, actor Frederick Kerr.

Kerr starred with Deborah Kerr (no relation) in Tea and Sympathy in 1956, reprising his role from the stage version.
   
In a widely publicized decision in 1956, Kerr declined to play the role of Charles Lindbergh in The Spirit of St. Louis because he did not respect Lindbergh's early alleged support of the Nazi regime in Germany prior to America's entry into World War II. "I don't admire the ideals of the hero", Mr. Kerr told The New York Post. The part instead went to Jimmy Stewart, a WWII veteran himself, who was over 20 years older than Kerr and nearly twice the age of Lindbergh when he made his historic 1927 flight. 
 
Kerr had a major role in the film version of Rodgers and Hammerstein's South Pacific  (1958), playing Lt. Joe Cable, the newly arrived marine about to be sent on a dangerous spy mission. In The Crowded Sky (1960), Kerr played a pilot who helps the Captain (Dana Andrews) steer a crippled airliner back to earth. Another film appearance was in Roger Corman's The Pit and the Pendulum (1961). In 1963, Kerr had a continuing role on Arrest and Trial, playing Assistant DA Barry Pine.

During the 1960s, Kerr guest starred on several TV series including The Alfred Hitchcock Hour, Rawhide, Gunsmoke and Adam-12. He had a regular role on the ABC-TV primetime TV series, Peyton Place, playing District Attorney John Fowler during the 1965-66 season. Also in 1964-65 he appeared as guest star on several episodes of Twelve O'Clock High.

In the 1970s, Kerr had a recurring role as prosecutor Gerald O'Brien on The Streets of San Francisco and he made guest appearances in several other TV programs including The Mod Squad, Columbo, McMillan and Wife, Barnaby Jones and The Feather and Father Gang.

Legal career
Kerr took an interest in film directing, and worked as an apprentice with Leo Penn, who was then directing episodes of the television series Run for Your Life — but Kerr was quickly disenchanted by the mundane aspects of the work, and applied to and was accepted at UCLA Law School. He received his J.D. degree from that law school, and passed the California bar in 1970. He later pursued a full-time career as a Beverly Hills lawyer, but still accepted occasional small roles in a variety of television productions over the years. He retired from legal practice in 2000.

Personal life
Kerr married Priscilla Smith in 1952; the couple divorced in 1972. He married Barbara Chu in 1979. He had two daughters and a son with Smith, as well as a stepson and stepdaughter from his marriage to Chu.

Kerr died of heart failure on February 2, 2013, at Huntington Hospital in Pasadena, California. He was cremated and his ashes given to his widow.

Stage credits

Other credits 

 Dream Girl (1947, summer repertory) 
 Joan of Lorraine (1946, summer repertory)
 September Tide (1949, summer repertory)
 Billy Budd (1951, Brattle Theatre)
 A Midsummer Night's Dream (1951, Brattle Theatre)
 Twelfth Night (1951, Brattle Theatre)
 A Sleep of Prisoners (1952, Brattle Theatre)
 Ring Round the Moon (1954, Hyde Park Theatre)
 The Rainmaker (1960, Wharf Theater)
 Five Finger Exercise (1961, La Jolla Playhouse)
 Sound Of Murder (1961, La Jolla Playhouse) - As director
 Love and Like (1962, UCLA Theatre Group)
 Antigone (1962, UCLA Theatre Group)
 Hamlet (1963, Stanford University)
 Liliom (1964, University of Oregon)
 Who's Afraid of Virginia Woolf? (1964) - As producer
 Androcles and the Lion (1964, American National Theater and Academy) - As producer
 Oedipus Rex (1964, American National Theater and Academy) - As producer
 J.B. (1964, American National Theater and Academy) - As producer
 Waiting for Godot (1964, American National Theater and Academy) - As producer
 Spoon River Anthology (1964, American National Theater and Academy) - As producer
 Desire Under the Elms (1964, American National Theater and Academy) - As producer
 The Tenth Man (1967, New York City Center)
 Mister Roberts (1965, Melodyland Theatre & Circle Star Theater)

Filmography

Film

Television

References

External links
 Obituary - Variety
 
 
 

1931 births
2013 deaths
Male actors from New York City
American male film actors
20th-century American male actors
American male stage actors
American male television actors
California lawyers
Donaldson Award winners
New Star of the Year (Actor) Golden Globe winners
Phillips Exeter Academy alumni
Theatre World Award winners
Tony Award winners
UCLA School of Law alumni
Harvard University alumni
20th-century American lawyers